Imperial Hydropathic Hotel Co, Blackpool v Hampson (1883) 23 Ch D 1 is a UK company law case, concerning the interpretation of a company's articles of association. On the specific facts it has been superseded by the Companies Act 2006 section 168, which allows a director to be removed through an ordinary majority resolution of the general meeting.

Facts
The articles of association of the Imperial Hydropathic Hotel Co (now The Imperial Hotel Blackpool) stated that the directors should hold office for three years and retire by rotation. At a general meeting, the shareholders passed a resolution to remove two directors who were not yet due to retire, and elected two others instead. The company claimed the directors had been validly removed.

Judgment
The Court of Appeal held that the company's articles could not be disregarded through a shareholder resolution. Where a company's articles limit the general meeting's power, the articles must be formally amended first, and may not simply be ignored, even with a majority large enough to change the articles. Lord Jessel MR gave the first judgment.

Cotton LJ concurred, saying,

Bowen LJ finished as follows.

See also

UK company law

References

External links
Old pictures of the hotel
The website for the hotel

United Kingdom company case law
Court of Appeal (England and Wales) cases
1882 in case law
1882 in British law